Strange Sex (Stylized as "{strange}SEX") is a 6-part TLC documentary television series produced by Sirens Media about sexual dysfunction that premiered on 18 July 2010.

Before the 6-part (half-hour each) series, Strange Sex was an hour-long documentary that originally aired on Discovery Health on 4 November 2009 that dealt with sex allergy, sex addiction, Persistent Genital Arousal Disorder, and sexomnia.

Episodes

Season one
1 “Strange Sex” (July 2010) - The series premiere profiles for individuals suffering from different sexual conditions. 

2 "Cougars and Cubs" (July 18, 2010) - A 73-year old former model, and a 33-year-old father of two go on a date. 

3 "Unusual Orgasms" (July 18, 2010) - Scientists examine a woman who claims she can “think” herself to orgasm. 

4 "Two Boyfriends & a Baby"(July 25, 2010) - Documenting a polyamorous relationship between a woman and two men. 

5 "Uncontrollable Urges"(July 25, 2010) - Rock musician “Phil Varone” discusses his sex addition. 

6 "Balloon Fetish" (August 1, 2010) - A man attends a party for balloon fetishists. 

7 "Pleasure and Pain"(August 1, 2010) - An embarrassing thing happens to a woman as her she has sex.

Season two
 "The Tugger & Double Trouble" (Apr 3, 2011) - A man attempting Foreskin restoration and a woman with uterus didelphys
 "Secret Pain" (Apr 3, 2011) - A woman with vaginismus
 "Size Matters & Gender Bender" (Apr 10, 2011) - Jonah Falcon and a woman with Swyer syndrome
 "Bedroom Coach & Hidden Manhood" (Apr 10, 2011) - Sex surrogate and a man recovering from Fournier gangrene, which has left him with a concealed penis
 "The More the Merrier & Surrogate Manhood" (Apr 17, 2011)
 "Born Without & A Broken Man" (Apr 17, 2011)
 "Right Guy Wrong Body"
 "Manhandled & The Real 40-Year-Old Virgin?" (May 8, 2011)
 "A Piercing Pleasure & Losing my Manhood" (May 15, 2011)
 "Weight For It & Desperate Measures" (May 22, 2011)

References

External links
 

2010 American television series debuts
2010s American documentary television series
2011 American television series endings
Sex education television series
TLC (TV network) original programming